Gustaw Ehrenberg (14 February 1818 in Warsaw – 28 September 1895 in Krakow) was a Polish poet as well as a probable son of Tsar Alexander I of Russia.

1818 births
1895 deaths
Polish male poets
19th-century Polish poets
19th-century Polish male writers
Alexander I of Russia